Donald Hunter may refer to:

 Donald Hunter (footballer, born 1927) (1927–2008), footballer for Huddersfield Town, Halifax Town & Southport
 Donald Hunter (footballer, born 1955), Scottish former footballer for Alloa Athletic
 Donald Hunter (physician) (1898–1978),  British physician and author
 Donald Hunter (judge) (1911–1991), Chief Justice of the Indiana Supreme Court
 Donald Hunter (character), a superhero, better known as Huntsman, in The League of Champions comics
 Don Hunter (artist), New Zealand artist and art educator